Misr Overseas Airways was an Egyptian scheduled and charter airline based in Cairo.

The airline was formed in 1981 as Air Lease Egypt and renamed to Misr Overseas Airways in January 1984. In 1988, the airline operated scheduled cargo flights to Cologne, Maribor and Khartoum, and charter flights to Africa, Asia, Europe and Latin America.

The airline ceased operations in 1989.

Code data
IATA: MO
ICAO: MOS

References

External links

Defunct airlines of Egypt
Airlines established in 1981
Airlines disestablished in 1989
1989 disestablishments in Egypt
Defunct cargo airlines
Egyptian companies established in 1981